Mária Tarnai (born 8 December 1941) is a Hungarian cross-country skier. She competed in two events at the 1964 Winter Olympics.

References

External links
 

1941 births
Living people
Hungarian female cross-country skiers
Olympic cross-country skiers of Hungary
Cross-country skiers at the 1964 Winter Olympics
People from Komárom
Sportspeople from Komárom-Esztergom County